In game theory, Silverman's game is a two-person zero-sum game played on the unit square.  It is named for mathematician David Silverman.

It is played by two players on a given set  of positive real numbers.

Suppose player A plays  and player B plays . Without loss of generality, assume player A chooses the larger number, so . Then the payoff to A is 0 if , 1 if  and  if .

A large number of variants have been studied, where the set  may be finite, countable, or uncountable.  Extensions allow the two players to choose from different sets, such as the odd and even integers.

References

 
 
Non-cooperative games